Nationality words link to articles with information on the nation's poetry or literature (for instance, Irish or France).

Events

 April — The Yellow Book first published (continues to 1897).
 June 22 — Nina Davis' first published translation from medieval Hebrew poetry into English, of Abraham ibn Ezra's The Song of Chess, appears in The Jewish Chronicle.
 November 8 — Robert Frost's poem "My Butterfly" is published on this date in the New York Independent, marking the first sale of his poetry. He earns $15.
 December 22 — Claude Debussy's symphonic poem Prélude à l'après-midi d'un faune, a free interpretation of Stéphane Mallarmé's 1876 poem, "L'après-midi d'un faune", is premièred in Paris.

Works published in English

Canada
 Bliss Carman, Low Tide on Grand Pré (original edition, 1983)
 Bliss Carman and Richard Hovey (an American), Songs from Vagabondia
 Frederick George Scott, My Lattice and Other Poems
 Arthur Stringer, Watchers of Twilight, and Other Poems

United Kingdom
 Laurence Binyon, Lyric Poems
 Robert Browning, Asolando
 Bliss Carman (Canadian) and Richard Hovey (American), Songs from Vagabondia
 John Davidson, Ballads and Songs, including "Thirty Bob a Week"
 Edmund Gosse, In Russet and Silver
 Selwyn Image, Poems and Carols
 Rudyard Kipling, "McAndrew's Hymn", first published in U.S.A.
 Robert Fuller Murray, Robert F. Murray: His Poems with a Memoir (posthumous, edited by Andrew Lang)
 AE, pen name of George William Russell, Homeward
 Algernon Charles Swinburne, Astrophel and Other Poems
 Katharine Tynan, Cuckoo Songs
 William Watson, Odes and Other Poems
 Oscar Wilde, The Sphinx
 W.B. Yeats, Irish poet published in the United Kingdom, The Land of Heart's Desire

United States
 Bliss Carman, Songs from Vagabondia, with Richard Hovey, a Canadian author published in the United States
 Ina Coolbrith, The Singer of the Sea
 Benjamin Franklin King, Jr., Ben King's Verse (posthumous; 2nd edition 1898)
 George Santayana, Sonnets and Other Verses
 John B. Tabb, Poems

Other in English
 Henry Lawson, Short Stories in Prose and Verse, Australia
 Kerala Varma Valiya Koil Thampuran, Mayura Sandesam, a sandesa kavya ("message poem") written on the model of Kalidasa's Meghaduta, India, Sanskrit
 W.B. Yeats, Irish poet published in the United Kingdom, The Land of Heart's Desire

Works published in other languages
 Francis Jammes, Vers, (also 1892 and 1893); France
 Henry Alfred Krishnapillai, Rakshanya Yatrikam ("The journey of salvation"), India, Tamil language
 Pierre Louÿs, Les Chansons de Bilitis ("The Songs of Bilitis"), erotic prose poems; Paris
 Tekkan Yosano, Bokoku no on ("Obligation to the Fatherland"), a collection of literary criticism, Japan

Awards and honors

Births
Death years link to the corresponding "[year] in poetry" article:
 January 2 – Robert Nathan (died 1985), American poet and novelist
 January 10 – Bochō Yamamura 山村 暮鳥 (died 1924), Japanese vagabond Christian preacher who gains attention as a writer of tales and songs for children and as a poet
 May 21 – Eileen Duggan (died 1972), New Zealand
 May 28 – Loa Ho (died 1943), Taiwan
 June 14 – W. W. E. Ross (died 1966), Canadian geophysicist and Imagist poet
 June 16 – Ogiwara Seisensui 荻原井泉水, pen name of Ogiwara Tōkichi (died 1976), Japanese haiku poet in the Taishō and Shōwa periods (surname: Ogiwara)
 August 31 – Charles Reznikoff, American poet, part of the Objectivist poetry movement
 October 4 – Jun Tsuji 辻 潤 (died 1944), Japanese author, poet, essayist, musician and bohemian (surname: Tsuji)
 October 7 – Doris Huestis Speirs (died 1989), Canadian painter, ornithologist and poet
 October 14 – E. E. Cummings (died 1962), American poet and painter
 October 18 – H. L. Davis (died 1960), American fiction writer and poet
 October 22 – Paul Grano (died 1975), Australian poet and journalist
 December 26 – Jean Toomer, American poet and novelist, part of the Harlem Renaissance
 Zahida Khatun Sherwani, writing as Zay Khay Sheen (died 1922), Indian Urdu language woman poet

Deaths

Birth years link to the corresponding "[year] in poetry" article:
 January 24 – Constance Fenimore Woolson (born 1840), American novelist, short-story writer and poet; a grandniece of James Fenimore Cooper
 April 7 – Benjamin Franklin King, Jr. (born 1857), American poet and humorist
 April 18 – Bankim Chandra Chattopadhyay (born 1838), Bengali poet, novelist, essayist and journalist
 May 16 – Kitamura Tokoku 北村透谷, pen-name of Kitamura Montaro (born 1868), Japanese, late Meiji period poet, essayist and a founder of the modern Japanese romantic literary movement (surname: Kitamura)
 May 26 – Roden Noel (born 1834), English poet
 July 5 – Betty Paoli (born 1815), Austrian poet
 July 17 – Charles Marie René Leconte de Lisle (born 1818), French poet of the Parnassian movement
 August 25 – Celia Thaxter (born 1835), American poet and story writer
 September 5 – Augusta Webster (born 1837), English poet
 October 7 – Oliver Wendell Holmes (born 1809), American physician, professor and poet
 October 28 – John Askham (born 1825), English shoemaker and poet
 December 3 – Robert Louis Stevenson (born 1850), Scottish novelist, poet, essayist and travel writer, of a brain haemorrhage, in Samoa
 December 29 – Christina Rossetti (born 1830), English poet, of cancer
 Also:
 Robert Fuller Murray (born 1863), American-born Scottish poet, of consumption
 Perunnelli Krishnan Vaidyar (born 1863), Indian, Malayalam-language poet

See also

 19th century in poetry
 19th century in literature
 List of years in poetry
 List of years in literature
 Victorian literature
 French literature of the 19th century
 Symbolist poetry
 Young Poland (Młoda Polska) a modernist period in Polish  arts and literature, roughly from 1890 to 1918
 Poetry

Notes

19th-century poetry
Poetry